Message from the Country is the fourth and final studio album by the Move, as well as the group's only album for EMI's Harvest label. It was recorded simultaneously with the first Electric Light Orchestra album, Electric Light Orchestra (or No Answer as it was called in the United States).  
A contractual obligation, it was to signal the end of The Move and allow them to continue as the Electric Light Orchestra.

Recording
By the time of Message from the Country, the band members had long since lost interest in the Move, and had already joined a newly formed band, Electric Light Orchestra (ELO). Recorded in 1970–71 at the same time that the Move was also laying down tracks for the first Electric Light Orchestra album, The Electric Light Orchestra (even during some of the same sessions), it inevitably has some similarities in style to the new band's debut album, especially the heavy use of "tracking up" (overdubbing) to capture all of the instruments being played by Roy Wood and Jeff Lynne. Nevertheless, Wood and Lynne were determined to maintain some differentiation between the sound of their two groups (for example, by confining Wood's saxophones to Message and the cellos to the ELO debut respectively).

During the sessions, the band recorded "10538 Overture," a Lynne composition that was originally intended to be a Move B-side. Wood overdubbed a cello riff over the basic track 15 times over, and he and Lynne decided the song was better suited to The Electric Light Orchestra.

The lengthy sessions for this album mostly involved only Wood and Lynne, because of all the overdubbing. During these sessions, bassist Rick Price quit The Move after he realized he was no longer needed, reducing it to a trio. Instead of replacing him, Roy Wood added bass duties to his other roles, as well as erasing Price's tracks on the existing songs and then re-recording the bass parts, but exactly why Wood re-tracked Price's parts is unclear. (Wood has confirmed that Price also played on the original take of "10538 Overture".) Drummer Bev Bevan, in the liner notes for the 2005 reissue of Message from the Country, is quoted as saying that it is his least favorite Move album, while Wood has said "It was probably the best one we ever did."

All previous Move singles had been solo Wood compositions, and recent singles had also featured Wood singing lead. For this album, Wood is credited to composing only four songs, with four songs from Lynne, one Lynne–Wood joint credit, and one Bevan song. Lead vocals on the album were ostensibly split between Wood and Lynne depending upon author, but according to Wood, many of The Move's songs were written collaboratively by him and Lynne and credited to only one of them for publishing reasons.

Release

The initial 1971 album on the Harvest label in the UK and Capitol in the US contained the same 10 tracks, but in different playing order and with a different cover, as did a later reissue on CD on Beat Goes On Records in the UK and One Way in the US. The bonus tracks on the 2005 reissue are alternative takes and A-sides or B-sides of singles. The US rights to the songs were transferred to United Artists shortly after the release of Message from the Country, and various compilation albums and CDs containing some combination of the album songs and five single tracks were released in the US by United Artists for years prior to the comprehensive reissue. One such album is Split Ends (1972); another is the album Great Move: The Best of The Move, released in 1995, by which time Capitol/EMI owned the rights to United Artists material in the US. The latter album, released only on CD contained a US radio ad for "Split Ends" as an unlisted track.

Wood's "Ella James" was released as a single in 1971, but it was quickly withdrawn when Harvest and the group felt that Wood's "Tonight" (not originally on Message) would be a more commercial choice for The Move's first single on the Harvest label. No other song from the album was ever issued as a single, although The Move released two more hit singles ("Chinatown" and "California Man", both written by Wood) before folding into ELO permanently. All three songs featured lead vocals from both Wood and Lynne. The cover painting was done by Wood, based on an idea by Lynne.

"Ella James" was later covered by The Nashville Teens. "No Time" was covered by Marshall Crenshaw in 2012.

In 2010, Rhapsody called it one of the best "longhaired" power pop albums of the 1970s.

Track listing

Personnel 
 Roy Wood – lead and backing vocals, guitars, steel guitar, recorders, bass, clarinet, bassoon, tenor and baritone saxes, percussion
 Jeff Lynne – lead and backing vocals, guitars, piano, percussion, Wurlitzer electric piano, tack piano, Moog, percussion, drums on "My Marge"
 Bev Bevan – drums, percussion, backing vocals, lead vocals on "Ben Crawley Steel Company"

References

1971 albums
Albums produced by Roy Wood
Albums produced by Jeff Lynne
The Move albums
Harvest Records albums
Capitol Records albums
Albums recorded at Olympic Sound Studios